William Hagan DuBarry (1894–1958) was the acting President of the University of Pennsylvania during parts of 1950–51, 1952, and 1953.  He held the position of Executive Vice President from 1944 to 1954.

References

1894 births
1958 deaths
University of Pennsylvania faculty
United States Army officers
Chief Administrators of the University of Pennsylvania
20th-century American academics